Amblyseius neochiapensis is a species of mite in the family Phytoseiidae.

References

neochiapensis
Articles created by Qbugbot
Animals described in 2000